Custódio or Custodio is both a given name and surname of Portuguese origin. Notable people with the name include:

Given name
 Custódio Castro (born 1983), Portuguese football midfielder
 Custodio Dos Reis (1922–1959), French road bicycle racer
 Custódio Ezequiel (born 1962), Portuguese sport shooter
 Custodio García Rovira (1780–1816), Neogranadine general, statesman and painter
 Custódio José de Melo (1840–1902), Brazilian naval officer and politician
 Custódio Muchate (born 1982), Mozambican basketball player
 Custódio Alvim Pereira (1915–2006), Portuguese clergyman, Archbishop of Lourenço Marques in Mozambique
 Custódio Pinto (born 1942), Portuguese football central midfielder

Surname
 Adriano Tomás Custodio Mendes (born 1961), Cape Verdean footballer of Portuguese nationality
 Ana María Custodio (1908–1976), Spanish film actress
 Bonbon Custodio (born 1982), Filipino basketball player
 Denílson Custódio Machado (born 1943), Brazilian football defensive midfielder and manager
 Maestro Custodio (14th-century), Benedictine monk living in the city of Oviedo in Asturias, Spain
 Mário Custódio Nazaré (born 1976), Brazilian footballer
 Olivier Custodio (born 1995), Swiss football midfielder
 Olga E. Custodio (born 1954), United States Air Force officer

Portuguese-language surnames
Portuguese masculine given names